Rachel Latuff (born March 2, 1991) is an American educator and beauty pageant titleholder from Minneapolis, Minnesota, who was crowned Miss Minnesota 2015. She competed for the Miss America 2016 title in September 2015.

Pageant career

Early pageants
Latuff's first pageant experience was an unsuccessful bid to become Miss Bayfront in Duluth, Minnesota. On July 21, 2012, Latuff won the Miss Midwest 2012 title. She competed in the 2013 Miss Minnesota pageant with the platform "Teach For America: Creating a Better Tomorrow for Youth Education" and a ribbon dance performance in the talent portion of the competition. She was not a finalist for the state title.

On January 4, 2014, Latuff won the Miss Saint Paul 2014 title. She competed in the 2014 Miss Minnesota pageant with the platform "Engage, Educate, Empower: Building Cultural Competency Through the Arts" and a ribbon dance performance in the talent portion of the competition. She was named fourth runner-up to winner Savannah Cole and won the pageant's Lifestyle and Fitness Award.

As a runner-up for Miss Minnesota, Latuff was chosen to represent Minnesota at the 2014 National Sweetheart pageant in Hoopeston, Illinois. She tied for the John Bitner Judge's Award but was not a finalist for this national crown.

Miss Minnesota 2015
On January 17, 2015, Latuff was crowned Miss Olmsted County 2015 and qualified for a third try at the state title. She entered the Miss Minnesota pageant at Eden Prairie High School in June 2015 as one of 27 local pageant qualifiers. Latuff's competition talent was a contemporary ribbon dance.  Her platform is "Teaching the Heart: Building the Social and Emotional Wellness of Youth and their Teachers".

Latuff won the competition on Saturday, June 13, 2015, when she received her crown from outgoing Miss Minnesota titleholder Savannah Cole. She earned more than $9,000 in scholarship money and other prizes from the state pageant. As Miss Minnesota, her activities include public appearances across the state of Minnesota.

In honor of her win, Wyatt's Twisted Americana restaurant in Hastings, Minnesota, added a special cheeseburger to their menu. Called "Miss Minnesota's Own – Rachel's Four Point Burger", it was served with lettuce, pickles, onions, and tomatoes and a side of french fries plus an onion ring topped by "sweet sparkles" as an imitation of her crown. Proceeds from the sale of the cheeseburger were donated to Latuff's platform cause and it was only available during the city's Rivertown Days festival in mid-July 2015.

Vying for Miss America 2016
Latuff was Minnesota's representative at the Miss America 2016 pageant in Atlantic City, New Jersey, in September 2015. In the televised finale on September 13, 2015, she placed outside the Top 15 semi-finalists and was eliminated from competition. She was awarded a $3,000 scholarship prize as her state's representative.

Early life and education
Latuff is a native of Hastings, Minnesota, and a 2009 graduate of Hastings High School. Her father is Scott Latuff and her mother is Wendy Latuff.

Latuff is a May 2013 graduate of the University of Minnesota Duluth where she earned a Bachelor of Fine Arts degree in art education. Since June 2014, Latuff has worked as a high school visual arts teacher at North Woods School in St. Louis County, Minnesota.

References

External links

Rachel Latuff official website
Miss Minnesota official website

Living people
1991 births
American beauty pageant winners
Miss America 2016 delegates
People from Hastings, Minnesota
People from Minneapolis
University of Minnesota Duluth alumni
Educators from Minnesota
American women educators
American women artists
Education activists
Female models from Minnesota